Pustularia is the scientific name of two genera of organisms and may refer to:

Pustularia (fungus), a genus of ascomycete fungi
Pustularia (gastropod), a genus of sea snails in the family Cypraeidae